Lulu's Back in Town is a television program broadcast on the BBC in 1968.

Episodes

External links 
 
 
 Library of Congress

References 

British music television shows